Lake Valley is an unincorporated community in the Rural Municipality of Eyebrow No. 193, Saskatchewan, Canada. It is located on a former Canadian Pacific Railway line from Moose Jaw to Riverhurst.

See also

 List of communities in Saskatchewan

Eyebrow No. 193, Saskatchewan
Unincorporated communities in Saskatchewan
Ghost towns in Saskatchewan